BBH may refer to:
 Brown Brothers Harriman & Co., a private investment bank in the United States 
 Bartle Bogle Hegarty, British advertising agency
 Bruce Barrymore Halpenny, writer and historian
 The Darkstalkers character Baby Bonnie Hood
 Baltic Beverages Holding, now owned by the Carlsberg Group
 Bún bò Huế, a noodle dish from Vietnam
 Baseball Heaven, an artificial turf baseball complex on Long Island
 Binary black hole, an astrophysical binary star system of two black holes orbiting each other
 Byun Baek-hyun, a South Korean singer and actor
 Brest Bretagne Handball, a French handball club

See also
 BBHS (disambiguation)